Chail Cricket Ground is a cricket ground located in Chail, Himachal Pradesh. The ground was established in 1893 by Bhupinder Singh Maharaja of Patiala who owned a summer-retreat in Chail, that time the ground was developed. The ground located at 2444 meters above sea level that make highest cricket ground in the world. The ground is surrounded by forest and is used as the school playground by Chail Military School. During school vacations it is also used for Polo. There is a well maintained Basketball court as well as there are goal posts for football.

References

External links 
 Chail at HP tourism

Buildings and structures in Shimla district
Cricket grounds in Himachal Pradesh
Defunct cricket grounds in India
Sports venues completed in 1891
1891 establishments in India

British-era buildings in Himachal Pradesh